Swami Pranavananda (IAST: Svāmī Praṇavānanda) also known as Yugācāryya Śrīmat Svāmī Praṇavānanda Jī Mahārāja (Bengali: যুগাচার্য্য শ্রীমৎ স্বামী প্রণবানন্দ জী মহারাজ; Hindi: युगाचार्य्य श्रीमत् स्वामी प्रणवानन्द जी महाराज), (29 January 1896 – 8 January 1941) was a Hindu yogi and saint who founded a not-for-profit and spiritual organization known as the Bharat Sevashram Sangha. He is remembered for his pioneering efforts to bring the modern Hindu society into the new age without compromising the essential values of ancient traditions of Hindu spirituality. Swamiji was one of the most influential spiritual leaders of modern India. He is still revered very much for his message of universal love, compassion for all humanity and social reform without giving up the nationalist zeal, the love of mother land.

He was born on 29 January 1896, the auspicious day of Maghi Purnima (16th Magha, 1302), in Bajitpur, a village in Faridpur District in undivided India (presently in Bangladesh). His parents Vishnu Charan Bhuia and Saradadevi were very pious and blessed by Lord Shiva to have a son for the mitigation of human suffering and universal emancipation. He was affectionately named Jaynath by his father at birth and later in his boyhood he was called Binod. Binod showed uncommon philosophical  inclinations and had divine visions since childhood and often could be seen in deep contemplation at the village school. He was popular with the children of the locality because of his helpful nature.

References

Further reading

External links

 Yugacharya Swami Pranavananda at Bharat Sevashram Sangha

1896 births
1941 deaths
20th-century Hindu religious leaders
Indian Hindu spiritual teachers
Hindu revivalists
Indian Hindu monks
Indian Hindu saints
Indian yogis
People from Faridpur District
Shaivite religious leaders
Tantra
Bengali Hindu saints
Scholars from Kolkata